The Perfect Couple is a 1954 West German romantic comedy film directed by Robert A. Stemmle and starring Ingeborg Körner, Hans Reiser, and Peter Mosbacher.

The film's sets were designed by the art directors Karl Vollbrecht and Wilhelm Vorwerg. It was shot on location in Berlin and Cologne.

Cast

References

Bibliography

External links 
 

1954 films
1954 romantic comedy films
German romantic comedy films
West German films
1950s German-language films
Films directed by Robert A. Stemmle
German black-and-white films
1950s German films